"How?" is a song from John Lennon's second solo album Imagine, released in 1971. Lennon recorded "How?" on 25 May 1971 at Ascot Sound Studios, during the sessions for his Imagine album. String overdubs took place on 4 July 1971 at the Record Plant, in New York City.

Personnel
Personnel per John Blaney.
John Lennon – vocals, piano
Nicky Hopkins – piano
Klaus Voormann – bass guitar
John Barham – vibraphone
Andy Davis – acoustic guitar
Alan White – drums
The Flux Fiddlers – strings

Covers
 The song was covered by the band Stereophonics as a B-side to the song "Handbags and Gladrags".
 The song was covered by English singer Julie Covington on her 1978 eponymous album.
 Ozzy Osbourne released a cover of this song in support of Amnesty International during the same week John Lennon would have become 70. He recorded a music video on the streets of New York to promote the single. Osbourne has previously stated that Lennon's song "Imagine" (from the same album as "How?") was an inspiration for Osbourne's own song "Dreamer".
 The song was covered by American singer/songwriter Amy LaVere on her 2014 record Runaway's Diary.

Notes

References

John Lennon songs
1971 songs
Songs written by John Lennon
Song recordings produced by John Lennon
Song recordings produced by Phil Spector
Song recordings produced by Yoko Ono
2010 singles